Birchwood railway station is a railway station serving the town of Birchwood Cheshire, England.

The station is operated by Northern Trains and is on the southern route of the Liverpool–Manchester Line. It is staffed full-time (between 0610 and 2345 Mondays–Saturdays and 0825 and 2320 Sundays).

Facilities
There is sheltered seating on both platforms with a ticket office with seating on the Manchester-bound platform. A footbridge connects the two platforms. Outside the station there is a bus stop and the station is close to the Birchwood shopping mall.

The ticket office is open until 22:00, though it does occasionally close during the day whilst staff carry out other duties. During the daytime there are three staff members on the station (station clerk, kiosk and a cleaner), and two of an evening (station clerk and a security guard). When the ticket office is closed there are 2 ticket machines in the station building on platform 1 and 1 in the waiting room on platform 2.  Train running information is provided by automated announcements, digital information screens and timetable posters. Step-free access is available via lifts on both platforms (commissioned in the autumn of 2014).

Services

The station sees a general frequency of three to four trains per hour, per direction. As of December 2022, services are provided by Northern Trains and TransPennine Express, with limited East Midlands Railway calls at certain points of the day.

Northern 
 One train per hour to  via  (serving most local stations)
 One train per hour to  via  (stopping only at some local stations en route)
Most stopping trains originating from Liverpool Lime Street now terminate at Warrington Central.

TransPennine Express 

East Midlands Railway 

 Two morning peak trains to Norwich
 One train per day to Liverpool Lime Street

History
The station was officially opened by British Rail Chairman Sir Peter Parker on 31 July 1981. Constructed at a cost of £750,000, it was the result of cooperation between British Rail, Warrington New Town Development Corporation, Warrington Borough Council and local bus companies. Bus interchange facilities were provided at the station, which served a developing residential and commercial area. The initial service provision was 50 trains per day.

References

External links

Railway stations in Warrington
DfT Category D stations
Railway stations opened by British Rail
Railway stations in Great Britain opened in 1981
Railway stations served by East Midlands Railway
Northern franchise railway stations
Railway stations served by TransPennine Express